The 2022 Calgary Stampeders season was the 64th season for the team in the Canadian Football League and their 77th overall. The Stampeders qualified for the playoffs for the 17th straight year following their victory over the BC Lions on September 24, 2022. However, the team was defeated by the BC Lions in the West Semi-Final. The 2022 CFL season was Dave Dickenson's sixth season as head coach and John Hufnagel's 14th season as general manager.

Offseason

CFL Global Draft
The 2022 CFL Global Draft took place on May 3, 2022. With the format being a snake draft, the Stampeders selected seventh in the odd-numbered rounds and third in the even-numbered rounds.

CFL National Draft
The 2022 CFL Draft took place on May 3, 2022. The Stampeders had the fifth selection in each of the eight rounds of the draft after losing the West Semi-Final and finishing fifth in the 2021 league standings.

Preseason

Schedule

Regular season

Standings

Schedule

Post-season

Schedule

Team

Roster

Coaching staff

References

External links
 

Calgary Stampeders seasons
2022 Canadian Football League season by team
2022 in Alberta